Chiridota is a genus of sea cucumbers in the family Chiridotidae. It is an extant genus but some fossil species are known.

Taxonomy
The following species are recognised in the genus Chiridota:

 Chiridota albatrossii Edwards, 1907
 Chiridota aponocrita Clark, 1920
 †Chiridota atava Waagen 1867
 Chiridota carnleyensis Mortensen, 1925
 Chiridota conceptacula Cherbonnier, 1963
 Chiridota discolor Eschscholtz, 1829
 Chiridota durbanensis Thandar, 1997
 †Chirodota elegans Malagoli 1888 (Pliocene)
 Chiridota exuga Cherbonnier, 1986
 Chiridota fernandensis Ludwig, 1898
 Chiridota ferruginea (Verrill, 1882)
 Chiridota gigas Dendy & Hindle, 1907
 Chiridota hawaiiensis Fisher, 1907
 Chiridota heheva Pawson & Vance, 2004
 †Chiridota heptalampra Bartenstein, 1936
 Chiridota hydrothermica Smirnov & Gebruk, 2000
 Chiridota impatiens Yamana & Tanaka, 2017
 Chiridota intermedia Bedford, 1899
 Chiridota kermadeca O'Loughlin & VandenSpiegel, 2012
 Chiridota laevis (O. Fabricius, 1780)
 Chiridota marenzelleri Perrier R., 1904
 Chiridota nanaimensis Heding, 1928
 Chiridota nigra Mortensen, 1925
 Chiridota ochotensis Savel'eva, 1941
 Chiridota orientalis Smirnov, 1981
 Chiridota pacifica Heding, 1928
 Chiridota peloria Deichmann, 1930
 Chiridota pisanii Ludwig, 1887
 Chiridota regalis Clark, 1908
 Chiridota rigida Semper, 1867
 Chiridota rotifera (Pourtalès, 1851)
 Chiridota smirnovi Massin, 1996
 Chiridota stuhlmanni Lampert, 1896
 Chiridota tauiensis Savel'eva, 1941
 †Cheirodota traquairii Etheridge 1881
 Chiridota uniserialis Fisher, 1907
 Chiridota violacea (J. Müller, 1849)

References

External links
 
 
 
 
 Chiridota at the World Register of Marine Species (WoRMS)

Holothuroidea genera
Chiridotidae